Gary Michael Lord (born 30 November 1967) is an Australian former swimmer.

Lord grew up in the Illawarra and trained at the Shellharbour-Warilla Amateur Swimming Club, where his father Mick was a swim coach. His sister Karen was a swimmer and featured at the 1988 Summer Olympics. An uncle, soccer goalkeeper Ron Lord, was also an Olympian.

An Australian Institute of Sport scholarship holder, Lord was a member of Australia's gold medal-winning 4 × 200 metre freestyle relay team at the Auckland Commonwealth Games. They swam the final in a games record time. He also swam in the 100 metre freestyle event and finished sixth.

References

1967 births
Living people
Australian male freestyle swimmers
Commonwealth Games gold medallists for Australia
Commonwealth Games medallists in swimming
Medallists at the 1990 Commonwealth Games
Swimmers at the 1990 Commonwealth Games
Sportsmen from New South Wales
People from Shellharbour
Australian Institute of Sport swimmers